Blainville-Crevon is a commune in the Seine-Maritime département of the Normandy region of northern France.

Geography

Toponymy
Medieval place-name in -ville (from Gallo-Romance VILLA 'farm, estate'). Mentioned as Bleduinvilla in 1050 - 1060. Probably *Bladwinus 'estate, Germanic name *Bladwinus is never recorded, but belongs possibly to the developments of the anthroponymic element blad. A similar name can be recognized in Blainville-sur-l'Eau (Villa Bladini 10th century) 'the estate of Bladinus '

Crevon is a former parrish (Chevron 1068 - 76, Kevron 13th century, Quevron → 16th). Crevon is the metathesis of the Norman Quevron, that is chevron 'beam' in French, that is to say "beam to cross the stream". Now the stream itself is called Crevon. Similar Norman place-name in Manche département Hébécrevon, with personal name Hébert < Herbert.

History 
It appeared for the first time in a charter by William the Conqueror referring to the Clères family feudal motte. Becoming the possession of the Mauquenchy family, Blainville, became a true fortress and was subsequently confiscated by the English at the beginning of the Hundred Years War and again in 1435. Later it became the possession of Jean d'Estouteville, who restored the castle and founded the college. During the French reconquest of Normandy, Henry IV held a council of war at Blainville castle on the eve of the fall of Rouen. The last owners, the Colbert-Seignelay family, demolished the old castle and built a chateau. The Chateau de Blainville was completely razed during the French Revolution. 
Around 1820, the two neighbouring villages of St-Arnoult and Crevon were joined with Blainville to become Blainville-Crevon.
It is a village of art, culture and history. A festival of world music named "Archeo-Jazz" takes place here annually at the end of June, in the ruins of the medieval castle.

Heraldry

Population

Places of interest
 The church of St.Michel, dating from the 15th century.
 The ruins of the 13th-century castle of Ac.
 The château de Mondétour, dating from the 18th century.

People with links to the commune
Marcel Duchamp (1887–1968), painter and sculptor, was born here.
Suzanne Duchamp-Crotti (1889–1963), his sister, also a painter.

See also
Communes of the Seine-Maritime department

References

External links

Official website of Blainville-Crevon 

Communes of Seine-Maritime